Bethel Church is an Armenian Evangelical Church in Aleppo, Syria.

It was founded in 1937, and its early membership was vastly of deportees from the Marash Armenian Evangelical community. The current pastor is Rev. Haroutune Selimian. 
In 2021, it was comprehensively restored because it was damaged through the war.

Pastors
Rev. Garabed Ketenjian (1922-1932)
Rev. Nerses Sarian (1932-1934)
Rev. Yeghia Kassouni (1935-1937)
Rev. Misag Manugian (1938-1939)
Rev. Hovhannes Apkarian (1939-1947)
Rev. Nerses Khachadourian (1947-1949)
Rev. Dikran Andreassian (1949-1956)
Rev. Hovhannes Karjian (1956-1957)
Rev. Lutfi Haidostian (1956-1957)
Rev. Vahan Bedigian (1957-1963)
Rev. Yessayi Sarmazian (1963-1969)
Mr. Sarkis Malakian (1963-1969)
Rev. Barkev Apartian (1969-1972)
Mr. Bedros Kelligian (1969-1972)
Rev. Manasseh Shnorhokian (1973-1975)
Rev. Hovhannes Sarmazian (1975-1978)
Rev. Ardashes Kerbabian (1975-1978)
Rev. Barkev Orchanian (1978-1981)
Rev. Hanna Sarmazian (1982-1988)
Mr. Melkon Melkonian (1990-1992)
Rev. Haroutune Selimian (1992-...)

References

Armenian Evangelical churches
Churches completed in 1937
Churches in Aleppo